Eduard Melkus (born 1 September 1928 in Baden bei Wien) is an Austrian violinist and violist.

Following the Second World War, Melkus dedicated himself to the exploration of historically informed performance. He was a member of the 1949 Vienna viola da gamba quartet, the select group of musicians that included Alice and Nikolaus Harnoncourt and the harpsichordist Gustav Leonhardt who started the Early Music movement.

He performed and recorded more than 200 works from the mid 17th through the late 18th centuries with his ensemble Capella Academica Wien, or the French harpsichordist Huguette Dreyfus, and in his time, tapped a worldwide audience.

From 1958, Melkus was a professor of violin, baroque violin, viola, and historical performance practice at the Vienna Academy of Music. In 1982 he became head of the Institute for Viennese Sound Style.

As a violin soloist, Eduard Melkus is a precursor to the current wave in the revival of historically informed baroque period performance. His best-known recordings include Deutsche Grammophon LPs of the Corelli Violin Sonatas, Opus 5 with rare extant 18th-century embellishments, prepared in conjunction with musicologist Marc Pincherle, the Biber Rosary Sonatas—for which he won the Deutscher Schallplattenpreis in 1967, Tartini/Nardini Violin Concerti, the LP Hoheschule der Violine which includes the first period-instrument performances of the Tomasso Vitali Chaconne and Tartini Devil's Trill Sonata, and the Violin Sonatas, Opus 1 of G.F. Handel, the Bach Violin Concerti, Tartini/Nardini Violin Concerti, Couperin Apotheoses/Leclair Tombeau sonata, and an important LP entitled Polish and Hanakian Folk Music in the Work of G.P. Telemann. For all these recordings, Melkus played an unaltered violin by Aegidius Kloz, made in Mittenwald ca. 1760, while the rest of his ensemble, the Cappella Academica Wien, played on far more expensive Italian instruments borrowed from the Vienna Akademie fur Musik and restored to resemble their original conditions. Melkus' later recordings of such works as Bach's Sonatas for Violin and Harpsichord were made on a retrofitted violin bearing the label of Nicolo Amati of Cremona, 1679; Amati ceased making instruments in 1670, dying in 1684, aged 87, so the instrument is the work of one of the makers he still supervised in his shop. Though perhaps richer-sounding, Melkus always sounded more daring and comfortable on the Kloz. Moreover, as Melkus always pointed out in liner notes, the Kloz is rare in that it survived with its original neck, bass-bar, and fingerboard, rather than requiring somewhat speculative retrofitting—which cannot be said for the Amati, and no Amatis survive in original state for restorer consultation. Melkus owns three other instruments by Nicolo Amati, comprising a complete string quartet by that unequalled maker.

Melkus is not much remembered today (2008) because his style included many anachronistic elements: the use of modern wire and wire-covered strings rather than gut, ubiquitous modern a1=440 pitch, a chin-rest (not even invented until the 1820s), and continuous, rather distracting, vibrato. In these ways, he departed from those better-known colleagues in Vienna with whom he began, the Harnoncourts. Oddly, he never adapted to methods that have been shown by scholars as more appropriate historically, even more recently. His older recordings are generally dismissed and have not been reissued on CD. It is a pity because, despite his less "authentic" sound, the recordings of the 1965-1971 period reveal in his playing what is lacking in most players today: an instantly recognizable personal sound and style, and most significantly, an enthusiasm for embellishing music in ways that more contemporary period players seldom attempt, but their 18th-century forebears did without question; in that sense, he is more "historical" than they—and to some listeners, more exciting.

Melkus has been the subject of two articles by Tully Potter, one in The Gramophone in January 2019 and the other in The Strad in July 2019.

Bibliography 
 15 Jahre Institut für Wiener Klangstil (1980-1995), Institut für Wiener Klangstil 1996, 
 Die Violine. Eine Einführung in die Geschichte der Violine und des Violinspiels, Schott, Mainz 2000, 
 Books written
 Der Bachbogen
 Die Violine als Objekt der Stilkunde
 Bogensetzung und Stricharten in der Musik Mozarts
 Bogensetzung und Stricharten im Werke Beethovens

References

Austrian classical violinists
Male classical violinists
Austrian classical violists
Baroque-violin players
Musicians from Baden bei Wien
1928 births
Living people
Austrian performers of early music
21st-century classical violinists
21st-century male musicians
21st-century violists